Studley is a surname. Notable people with the surname include:

 Chuck Studley, American football coach
 Elmer E. Studley, American politician
 Henry O. Studley, organ and piano maker and carpenter
 John Studley, Elizabethan translator
 Sy Studley (1841–1901), American baseball player